Mario Carlos Culebro Velasco (born 24 November 1958) is a Mexican politician affiliated with the Institutional Revolutionary Party. He served as Deputy of the LIX Legislature of the Mexican Congress representing Chiapas, as well as the Congress of Chiapas.

References

1958 births
Living people
Politicians from Chiapas
Institutional Revolutionary Party politicians
Members of the Congress of Chiapas
Autonomous University of Chiapas alumni
20th-century Mexican politicians
21st-century Mexican politicians
Deputies of the LIX Legislature of Mexico
Members of the Chamber of Deputies (Mexico) for Chiapas